Tiszaújváros is a district in south-eastern part of Borsod-Abaúj-Zemplén County. Tiszaújváros is also the name of the town where the district seat is found. The district is located in the Northern Hungary Statistical Region.

Geography 
Tiszaújváros District borders with Szerencs District to the northeast, Tiszavasvári District (Szabolcs-Szatmár-Bereg County) and Hajdúnánás District (Hajdú-Bihar County) to the east, Mezőcsát District to the south, Miskolc District to the northwest. The number of the inhabited places in Tiszaújváros District is 16.

Municipalities 
The district has 1 town and 15 villages.
(ordered by population, as of 1 January 2012)

The bolded municipality is the city.

Demographics

In 2011, it had a population of 31,842 and the population density was 128/km².

Ethnicity
Besides the Hungarian majority, the main minorities are the Roma (approx. 2,000) and German (150).

Total population (2011 census): 31,842
Ethnic groups (2011 census): Identified themselves: 29,552 persons:
Hungarians: 27,032 (91.47%)
Gypsies: 1,955 (6.62%)
Others and indefinable: 565 (1.91%)
Approx. 2,000 persons in Tiszaújváros District did not declare their ethnic group at the 2011 census.

Religion
Religious adherence in the county according to 2011 census:

Catholic – 10,549 (Roman Catholic – 9,443; Greek Catholic – 1,102); 
Reformed – 5,746;
Evangelical – 55;
other religions – 295; 
Non-religious – 5,479; 
Atheism – 338;
Undeclared – 9,380.

Gallery

See also
List of cities and towns of Hungary

References

External links
 Postal codes of the Tiszaújváros District

Districts in Borsod-Abaúj-Zemplén County